Kazuoki (written:  or ) is a masculine Japanese given name. Notable people with the name include:

, Japanese daimyō
, Japanese mathematician
, Japanese Nordic combined skier
, Japanese sailor

Japanese masculine given names